Speed limits in Finland are generally:

 Motorways: 120 km/h
 In winter limits are often lowered to 100 km/h as decided each year by local authority.
 Motorways close to urban areas are always 100 km/h.
 Main provincial roads (paved)- 100 km/h or 80 km/h (by location, and often in winter).
 Rural roads- 80 km/h (paved or gravel), unless otherwise indicated.
 Within a built-up area- 50 km/h unless otherwise indicated.

The speed limits in Finland are 20, 30, 40, 50, 60, 70, 80, 100 and 120 km/h. But the signs are always displayed with the actual speed limit value rather than having «end of speed limit» signs, unlike most other countries in Europe.

Usage of speed limits 
20 km/h
 Special streets in cities (pedestrian zones, yard streets)
30 km/h
In residential areas 
40 km/h
 In built-up areas
50 km/h
 On big streets in built-up areas
60 km/h
 On big streets in built-up areas
 On small roads outside built-up areas
70 km/h
On big roads close to big cities
80 km/h
On rural roads
 On single carriageway main roads especially in winter
100 km/h
On motorways close to big cities and in winter on all motorways
Expressways/dual carriageway main roads 
Good quality single carriageway main roads especially in summer 
Some good quality paved regional roads with low traffic in summer
120 km/h
 Motorways in summer

Max Speed Limits  

Finnland
Law of Finland
Road transport in Finland